Zibei Pavilion is a Chinese pavilion located at the foot of Mount Yuelu, in Yuelu District of Changsha, Hunan, China.

Etymology
The name "Zibei" based on a sentence "" comes from Doctrine of the Mean, one of the Four Books of Confucian philosophy.

History
The original pavilion dates back to 1688, in the 27th year of Kangxi period (1661–1722) of the Qing dynasty (1644–1911). In 1812, Peng Mingyao, president of Yuelu Academy, moved it to its current address. The present version was completed in 1861, during the reign of Xianfeng Emperor (1851–1861).

References

Buildings and structures in Changsha
Qing dynasty architecture
1688 establishments in China